David Haro Iniesta (born 17 July 1990) is a Spanish footballer who plays as a right winger or a forward for Finnish club Inter Turku.

Club career
Born in L'Ametlla del Vallès, Barcelona, Catalonia, Haro represented CF Ametlla del Vallès, EC Granollers and CE Europa as a youth. In 2009, he joined UE Sants in the Primera Catalana, making his senior debut for the club during the campaign and scoring a career-best 16 goals.

In July 2010, Haro joined Tercera División side AE Prat. On 2 June of the following year, after being a key unit for the club, he signed for CE L'Hospitalet in Segunda División B.

On 26 June 2012, Haro signed a one-year contract with Gimnàstic de Tarragona, freshly relegated to the third level. After being mainly used as a substitute, he returned to Hospi on 10 July 2013.

On 4 July 2015, Haro agreed to a two-year deal with CF Reus Deportiu, still in the third division. He scored ten goals for the club during the campaign (including two in the play-off finals against Racing de Santander), as his side achieved promotion to Segunda División for the first time ever.

Haro made his professional debut on 6 November 2016, replacing Jorge Miramón in a 0–1 home loss against Levante UD. The following 17 January, he renewed his contract with the club.

On 13 July 2018, free agent Haro moved abroad for the first time in his career, joining Allsvenskan side GIF Sundsvall. On 3 July of the following year, he returned to his home country after agreeing to a deal with CD Atlético Baleares in division three.

On 14 February 2022, Haro signed with Inter Turku in Finland for the 2022 season.

References

External links

1990 births
Living people
People from Vallès Oriental
Sportspeople from the Province of Barcelona
Spanish footballers
Footballers from Catalonia
Association football wingers
Association football forwards
UE Sants players
AE Prat players
CE L'Hospitalet players
Gimnàstic de Tarragona footballers
CF Reus Deportiu players
GIF Sundsvall players
CD Atlético Baleares footballers
UE Costa Brava players
FC Inter Turku players
Segunda División players
Segunda División B players
Tercera División players
Allsvenskan players
Spanish expatriate footballers
Spanish expatriate sportspeople in Sweden
Expatriate footballers in Sweden
Spanish expatriate sportspeople in Finland
Expatriate footballers in Finland